The Bible Society of Ghana is a non-denominational, non-governmental Christian organization based in Ghana. The organization is registered under the Trustees Act, 1962 of the Republic of Ghana. It is the largest Bible distribution organization in Ghana.

History
In the late 1950s and early 1960s Rev. Prof. Baeta, Mr. A. L. Quansah and Mr. E. S. Aidoo discussed and established a national Society with others. The Society opened it head office, The Bible House, on 18 September 1965. Full operation as a national Bible Society started in 1966 and it became a full member of the United Bible Societies in 1968.

Purpose
The organization translates, publishes and distributes Bibles at  affordable prices (comes with high subsidies) and promotes its use to transform lives. The organisation has a vision of reaching every home in Ghana with the word of God in a language they understand.

Collaborations
BSG along with Ghana Institute of Linguistics, Literacy and Bible Translation and the United Bible Societies (UBS) form the three main organisations involved in Bible translation in Ghana.

References

Civic and political organisations of Ghana
Bible societies